Arcturides is a genus of crustaceans belonging to the monotypic family Arcturididae.

Species:

Arcturides acuminatus 
Arcturides cornutus 
Arcturides miersi 
Arcturides richardsoni 
Arcturides scutatas

References

Isopoda